The 2015–16 Portland State Vikings women's basketball team represented Portland State University during the 2015–16 NCAA Division I women's basketball season. The Vikings, led by first year head coach Lynn Kennedy, played their home games at the Peter Stott Center and were members of the Big Sky Conference. They finished the season 4–26, 2–16 in Big Sky play to finish in a 3-way tie for tenth place. They lost in the first round of the Big Sky women's tournament to Weber State.

Roster

Schedule

|-
!colspan=9 style="background:#02461D; color:#FFFFFF;"| Exhibition

|-
!colspan=9 style="background:#02461D; color:#FFFFFF;"| Non-conference regular season

|-
!colspan=9 style="background:#02461D; color:#FFFFFF;"| Big Sky regular season

|-
!colspan=9 style="background:#02461D;"| Big Sky Women's Tournament

See also
2015–16 Portland State Vikings men's basketball team

References

Portland State
Portland State Vikings women's basketball seasons
Portland State Vikings women's basketball
Portland State Vikings women's basketball